Angel on the Right (Farishtai kitfi rost) is a 2002 Tajik comedy-drama film directed by Jamshed Usmonov. It was screened in the Un Certain Regard section at the 2002 Cannes Film Festival.

Plot
This dark comedy, the third feature film for Jamshed Usmonov, is set, and filmed on location, in the Tajik town of Asht. After serving a long prison sentence, a remorseless man returns to his home village. While trying to help his mother die with dignity, the man endures multiple run-ins with the unyielding villagers who expect to collect on his myriad overdue debts. The cast of this film is the real-life population of the town of Asht itself. Usmonov cast his own mother and brother for the lead roles in the film.

Cast
 Uktamoi Miyasarova as Halima
 Maruf Pulodzoda as Hamro
 Kova Tilavpur as Yatim
 Mardonkul Kulbobo as Mayor
 Malohat Maqsumova as Savri
 Furkat Burlev as The Barman
 Orzuqui Kholikov as Young man with goat
 Hokim Rakhmonov as Dervish
 Tolib Temuraliev as The Millionaire
 Davras Azimov as The Doormaker

References

External links

2002 films
Tajikistani drama films
Tajik-language films
2002 comedy-drama films
Films directed by Jamshed Usmonov